Deadly Awards 2004 the awards were an annual celebration of Australian Aboriginal and Torres Strait Islander achievement in music, sport, entertainment and community.

Music
Most Promising New Talent in Music: Casey Donovan
Single Release of the Year: Talk about love – Christine Anu
Album Release of the Year: Djarridjarri (blue flag) – Saltwater Band
Band of the Year: The Donovans
Music Artist of the Year: Troy Cassar-Daley
Jimmy Little Award for Lifetime Achievement in Aboriginal and Torres Strait Music: Mandawuy Yunupingu
Excellence in Film & Theatrical Score: Archie Roach, Ruby Hunter and Paul Grabowsky – Ruby’s Story

Sport
Most Promising New Talent in Sport: Brett Lee
Outstanding Achievement in AFL: Gavin Wanganeen
Outstanding Achievement in Rugby League: Amos Roberts
Male Sportsperson of the Year: Joshua Ross
Ella Award for Lifetime Achievement in Aboriginal and Torres Strait Islander Sport: Tony Mundine
Female Sportsperson of the Year: Michelle Musselwhite

The arts
Dancer of the Year: Jason Pitt
Outstanding Achievement in Film and Television: Ernie Dingo
Outstanding Achievement in Literature: Dr Larissa Behrendt
Actor of the Year: David Gulpilil
Visual Artist of the Year: Michael Riley

Community
DEST Award for Outstanding Achievement in Aboriginal and Torres Strait Islander Education: Chris Sarra
Outstanding Achievement in Aboriginal and Torres Strait Islander Health: Dr Ngaire Brown
Broadcaster of the Year: Bevan Rankins, WAAMA 100.9fm

References

External links
Deadlys 2004 winners at Vibe Australia

The Deadly Awards
2004 in Australian music
Indigenous Australia-related lists